The Albert County Museum is located in Hopewell Cape, New Brunswick. The Museum consists of eight buildings on a six-acre site and features twenty-two themed galleries.  All of the buildings are original to the site and are part of the overall history presented.  The County Tax Office, County Records Office and County Gaol are from the time of the creation of Albert County in 1845.  The County Court House on the site was built in 1904 to replace the original that had been lost in a fire earlier.  The complex encompasses what was known as the Shiretown (capital) of Albert County. The Albert County Museum is owned and operated by the Albert County Historical Society Incorporated, a Registered Canadian Charity.

The museum houses the Prime Minister R.B. Bennett Commemorative Centre which opened in 2010 to commemorate the life of the Canadian Prime Minister, R. B. Bennett, who grew up in the community. It also contains artifacts and displays related to the convicted murderer, Tom Collins.

References

External links

 Albert County Museum

History museums in New Brunswick
Museums in New Brunswick
Open-air museums in Canada
Buildings and structures in Albert County, New Brunswick
Tourist attractions in Albert County, New Brunswick